Shaun Adendorff (born ) is a South African professional rugby union player for  in Premiership Rugby. His regular position is flanker.

Career

KwaZulu-Natal

Adendorff was selected to represent his local KwaZulu-Natal provincial union at both the 2005 Under-13 Craven Week for primary schools tournament and at the 2008 Under-16 Grant Khomo Week tournament. He didn't represent them at Craven Week level though and opted to move to Pretoria to join the  academy after high school.

Blue Bulls / South Africa Under-20 / UP Tuks

Adendorff joined the Blue Bulls academy for the 2011 season and was selected to play for the  side in the 2011 Under-19 Provincial Championship.

In 2012, he was selected in the South Africa Under-20 squad for the 2012 IRB Junior World Championship, which was held in South Africa. Adendorff started their first match in the competition, but the hosts got off to a bad start, losing 19–23 to Ireland. He wasn't included in the matchday squad as South Africa recovered to beat Italy 52–3 in their second match, but he returned to the starting line-up as they beat England 28–15 to finish top of the log. Adendorff was a key figure in South Africa's vital victory, scoring two tries in the match. He started his third match of the tournament as South Africa easily dispatched Argentina in the semi-final, winning 35–3, and was named on the bench for the final against New Zealand. He didn't get any game time in the match, as South Africa won 22–16 in the final, to win the competition for the first time and ending New Zealand's four-year reign as champions.

Adendorff returned to domestic action for the  side in the 2012 Under-21 Provincial Championship. Despite still being in the Under-20 age group, he quickly established himself in the team.

UP Tuks beat  61–24 in the semi-final and three-time champions  44–5 in the final to win the competition for the second consecutive season.

Shortly after the Varsity Cup, Adendorff joined the  squad that competed in the 2013 Vodacom Cup.

He scored tries their matches against  and the s as the Blue Bulls finished in second spot on the log. Following a victory over the Sharks in the semi-final, Adendorff ended on the losing side of a Provincial Championship final for the third consecutive season as the s beat them 30–23 in Cape Town.

South Africa Sevens

Adendorff was then contracted by the South African Rugby Union for the South Africa Sevens squad. He represented them at the final two events of the 2013–14 IRB Sevens World Series, the 2014 Scotland Sevens and 2014 London Sevens. However, this proved to be his only involvement with the main South Africa Sevens squad, although he did represent their Academy squad on occasion.

Boland Cavaliers

Adendorff returned to fifteen-man rugby in 2016 by moving to Wellington-based outfit  for the 2016 season.

Aurillac

Adendorff moved to French Pro D2 side  prior to the 2018–19 season.

Northampton Saints
Abendorff signed for Premiership Rugby side Northampton Saints ahead of the 2020–21 season.

References

1992 births
Living people
Blue Bulls players
Boland Cavaliers players
Bulls (rugby union) players
Northampton Saints players
Rugby union flankers
Rugby union players from Durban
South Africa international rugby sevens players
South Africa Under-20 international rugby union players
South African rugby union players
Stade Aurillacois Cantal Auvergne players
USON Nevers players